Still-Life with Partridge and Gauntlets is a 1504 painting by the Italian painter Jacopo de' Barbari.  It measures  and is held by the Alte Pinakothek in Munich.  The small oil-on-limewood-panel painting is considered to be one of the earliest examples of a still life painting, and one of the first trompe-l'œil paintings, to be made in Europe since classical antiquity. 

The painting depicts a dead grey partridge, with two iron gauntlets, and a crossbow bolt passing through them. The set of objects appears as if it is lying on top of a wooden table or hanging from a nail against a wooden wall.  To the lower right is a scrap of paper with the date and the painter's signature, and a drawing of caduceus, a symbol used by Jacopo de' Barbari. It is painted on a panel of linden wood, with the background painted to imitate wood grain. The panel may have been made as the back or the hinged cover for a portrait, or as an amusing decoration for a hunting room. It is held by the Alte Pinakothek, and has been in the Bavarian State Painting Collections since 1804, before which it was held at the Schloss Neuburg since at least 1764.

The British Museum holds a similar drawing of a dead grey partridge by Jacopo de' Barbari, also dated to 1504, from the collection of Sir Hans Sloane.

See also
 Two Venetian Ladies, a 1490 painting by Vittore Carpaccio with a trompe-l'œil letter rack painted on the back: another candidate for the first trompe-l'œil painting since antiquity

References

 Totes Rebhuhn mit Eisenhandschuhen und Armbrustbolzen, Bayerische Staatsgemäldesammlungen
 Still-Life with Partridge and Gauntlet, Web Gallery of Art
 Study of a dead grey partridge, British Museum

1504 paintings
Still life paintings
Collection of the Alte Pinakothek
Trompe-l'œil paintings
Birds in art
Death in art